Left Socialist Accord (in Spanish: Acuerdo Socialista de Izquierda), was a political alliance in Peru founded in 1989 by three groups that left IU: Revolutionary Socialist Party (PSR), Revolutionary Communist Party (PCR) and Peruvian Socialist Movement (MSP). ASI contested the 1989 municipal elections. Later ASI was dissolved.
1989 establishments in Peru
Defunct left-wing political party alliances
Defunct political party alliances in Peru
Political parties established in 1989
Socialist parties in Peru
Peru